Jackson Lewis P.C. is an American law firm focusing on labor and employment law.

Jackson Lewis is organized into 20 practice groups and 19 industry groups. The majority of these groups are focused on labor and employment law, but the firm also has expertise in healthcare and collegiate and professional sports law. Practice and industry group members are spread across all of the firm's offices. The firm has over 950 attorneys and 61 offices, including its Puerto Rico office. The firm is a founding member of L&E Global Employers’ Counsel Worldwide, an alliance of workplace law firms in 20 countries. The firm is led by a board of directors, and its current chair is Kevin G. Lauri.

According to Steven Greenhouse of the New York Times, Jackson Lewis “is widely known as one of the most aggressively anti-union law firms in the U.S.”

History 
Jackson Lewis was founded by Lou Jackson and Robert Lewis in 1958. The firm's first office was opened in New York City in 1958. It opened its second office in Los Angeles in 1977. The firm's period of most rapid growth was between 2006 and 2015. In 2013, Jackson Lewis opened its first office outside of the continental US in San Juan, Puerto Rico.

In 2018, the firm partnered with “ROSS Intelligence” to utilize its legal research AI.

Practice groups 
Jackson Lewis' practice groups include:

Advice and Counsel
Affirmative Action, OFCCP and Government Contract Compliance
Class Actions and Complex Litigation
Collegiate and Professional Sports
Corporate Diversity Counseling
Corporate Governance and Internal Investigations
Disability, Leave and Health Management
Employee Benefits
ERISA Complex Litigation
Immigration
International Employment
Labor Relations
Litigation
Privacy, Data and Cybersecurity
Restrictive Covenants, Trade Secrets and Unfair Competition
Trials and Appeals
Wage and Hour
White Collar and Government Enforcement
Workplace Safety and Health
Workplace Training

Awards 
In part for its role in creating “workthruIT”, a web-based, self-service labor and employment law compliance application, Jackson Lewis was recognized as the “2018 Innovative Law Firm of the Year” by the International Legal Technology Association (ILTA)

References

External links
 

Law firms based in New York (state)
Law firms established in 1958
Companies based in White Plains, New York
1958 establishments in New York City